Gdańsk Shakespeare Festival is an international theatre festival devoted to the idea of the Elizabethan theatre, and especially to the works of William Shakespeare. The event was first organized in 1993, on the initiative of Theatrum Gedanense Foundation, which had been created by Professor Jerzy Limon and Władysław Zawistowski, with Charles, Prince of Wales as its patron. Its original name, "Gdańsk Shakespeare Days" was transformed into "Gdańsk Shakespeare Festival" in 1997, during the celebration of Gdańsk's millennium.

The Festival is held annually during the first week of August. Most of the plays are performed on the theatre scenes of Gdańsk, Sopot, and Gdynia (Tricity). Some are shown in spaces such as st. John's Church, the former Royal Gun Factory, or Gdańsk Shipyard and in the open air.).

The Festival aims at presenting and popularizing the output of William Shakespeare by presentation of his plays, but also by other means. After the performances the public can meet with directors and actors. Within the framework of the festival an educational program for students is organized as well. It is called "Letnia Akademia Szekspirowska" (Summer Shakespeare Academy).

Golden Yorick prize
It is a prize given every year to the best Polish staging of the Shakespearean play in a theatre season. It has been awarded by the Theatrum Gedanense Foundation since 1994. Each year the prizewinning performances are invited to participate in the Gdańsk Shakespeare Festival.

Winners
1994 – Love's Labour's Lost Polish Theatre in Warsaw, directed by Maciej Prus
1995 – Romeo and Juliet Polish Theatre in Wrocław, directed by Tadeusz Bradecki
1996 – the main prize was not awarded, distinction: As You Like It Helena Modrzejewska Theatre in Legnica, directed by Robert Czechowski
1997 – As You Like It Dramatic Theatre in Warsaw, directed by Piotr Cieślak
1998 – Measure for Measure Old Theatre in Cracow, directed by Tadeusz Bradecki
1999 – Coriolanus Helena Modrzejewska Theatre in Legnica, directed by Jacek Głomb and Krzysztof Kopka
2000 – The Merry Wives of Windsor Powszechny Theatre in Warsaw, directed by Piotr Cieplak
2001 – King Lear Nowa Łódź Theatre, directed by Mikołaj Grabowski
2002 – A Midsummer Night's Dream National Theatre in Warsaw, directed by Jerzy Grzegorzewski
2003 – The Tempest TR Warszawa, directed by Krzysztof Warlikowski
2004 – Richard III Nowy Theatre in Poznań, directed by Janusz Wiśniewski
2005 – main prize: The Comedy of Errors Nowy Theatre in Łódź, directed by Maciej Prus, distinction: 2007: Macbeth TR Warszawa, directed by Grzegorz Jarzyna, special prize: H Wybrzeże Theatre in Gdańsk, directed by Jan Klata
2006 – Romeo and Juliet Norwid Theatre in Jelenia Góra, directed by Krzysztof Rekowski
2007 – Measure for Measure Powszechny Theatre in Warsaw, directed by Anna Augustynowicz 
2008 – The Tempest Nowy Theatre in Poznań, directed by Janusz Wiśniewski
2009 – the main prize was not awarded, First distinction: The Taming of the Shrew Wybrzeże Theatre, directed by Szymon Kaczmarek; Honorary distinction: Othello. Variations on a Theme Stefan Jaracz Theatre, directed by Agata Duda-Gracz in the Competition for the Best Shakespeare Production in the 2008/2009 season.

Accompanying events

Summer Shakespeare Academy consists of theatrical and creative workshops conducted by Polish artists and famous foreign personalities. The participants are encouraged to develop their passions for theatre, dance, photography or painting.

Shakespeare Daily is the newspaper that has accompanied the festival for many years. It is created and edited by the participants of journalism workshops. It contains the information about festival events, reviews, and articles about plays and artists.

'Dolne Miasto Górą' (which could be translated as "Dolne Miasto is the Best") is the common name of various artistic workshops organised in Dolne Miasto and Orunia (districts of Gdańsk). It is also called "Shakespeare mania" and consists of free workshops for children and teenagers conducted by young artists from Gdańsk. The project was created by Joanna Śnieżko-Misterek, Teatrum Gedanense Foundation and Gdańsk Shakespeare Theatre. The aim of the action is to make the youth conscious of their abilities and to help them develop their interests and self-esteem. The end of the workshops is always celebrated with a theatrical parade. Actors, human-shaped puppets and various artists, together with the residents of Dolne Miasto, march along Długi Targ, which is the centre of the Old Town of Gdańsk.

The events do not end with the festival's last day. After the festival photographic and literary competitions are organised. Each year a competition for the best festival photograph and review is held. There is also an annual exhibition of the works of young independent artists.

Editions of the festival

13th Shakespeare Festival
13th Shakespeare Festival was held 1–10 August 2009. It was the first edition of the festival that had a theme – multimedia. Many of the festival theatre groups employed multimedia in their performances. The event was accompanied by an international conference on the phenomenon of multimedia arts in the theatre: Blending the Media. Art in the theatre/theatre in the arts. Among the guests of the conference were such theatre studies stars as Marvin Carlson, Patrice Pavis, Bryan Reynolds, Erika Fischer-Lichte czy Eli Rozik. A lecture was given by Elizabeth LeCompte, the founding member and the director of an experimental theater collective – The Wooster Group.

It was during this edition that festival performances could be seen outside the Tricity for the first time. This event was called Shakespeare in Pomerania Region. "A Midsummer Night's Dream" by the Globe Theatre was shown in Słupsk, Pruszcz Gdański, and Kościerzyna.

Performances of the main stage:
 HAMLET/Amleto. Nella Carne il Silenzio – Compagnia Laboratorio di Pontendera (Italy)
 The Merchant of Venice and A Midsummer Night's Dream – two performances by Propeller company from Watermill Theatre, Great Britain
 Hamlet – The Wooster Group (USA)
 Warum, Warum directed by Peter Brook – Miriam Goldschmidt's monodrama
 A Midsummer Night's Dream – Globe Theatre (Great Britain)
 The Merchant of Venice – Bremer Shakespeare Company (Germany)
 The Taming of the Shrew – The Wybrzeże Theatre (Poland), First distinction in the Golden Yorick competition
 King Richard III – co-production of two theatres: The Hungarian Theatre of Cluj (Romania) and The Gyulai Castle Theatre (Hungary)
 Othello. Variations on a theme – The Stefan Jaracz Theatre, Łódź (Poland), Honorary distinction in the Golden Yorick Competition
 Hamlet – The Radu Stanca National Theatre in Sibiu (Romania)
As a part of Shakespeare Miniature Scenes were shown:
 "O, that this too too solid flesh..." – performance by the students of London Metropolitan University, based on several William Shakespeare's plays (Hamlet, Romeo and Juliet, Much Ado about Nothing, A Midsummer Night's Dream, As You Like It)
 "Hamlet, or the End of Childhood" – The Naxos Theatre Group (France)
 "A Midsummer Night's Dream" by students of the Warsaw Theatrical Academy, the performance based on Shakespeare's play and the music of Philip Glass and King Crimson
 "The Tempest" by The Parrabbola Group in collaboration with Lightwork Theatre company (Great Britain). Klub Zak Theatre. The cast included Brett Brown as Ferdinand, Bryony Hannah as Miranda and Scott Handy as Prospero.

12th Shakespeare Festival

12th Shakespeare Festival was held 2–9 August 2008. Among the many performances of the year, the festival included a variety of workshops and lectures by distinguished theatre practitioners. Caleb Marshall (Shakespeare Globe Theatre, Great Britain) gave an acting workshop on Romeo and Juliet, Yoshihiro Kurita (Ryutopia Theatre, USA) and Jarosław Bielski (Replika Theatre, Spain) gave acting workshops on Hamlet, and Bryan Reynolds and Chris Marshall (Transversal Theatre, USA) gave a workshop on transversal acting methodology. Ińaki Arana (Real Escuela Superior de Arte Dramatico, Spain) gave an artistic swordplay workshop, and Bare Feet (Zambia) and the Other Side of the Mirror Theatre (Gdańsk) gave African dance and drumming workshops. Also, Lonnie Alcaraz (Transversal Theatre, USA) gave a workshop for lighting directors and Michael Hooker (Transversal Theatre, USA) gave a workshop for sound directors.

Performances of the main stage:

 Macbeth – ARKA theatre, Wrocław
 The Winter's Tale – Ryutopia Theatre, Japan
 Hamlet – Polski Theatre, Wrocław
 SHAKESPEARE SOLO – Ophelia – State Youth Theatre, Armenia
 Richard after Richard – Theatre in the Basket, Ukraine
 Hamletmachine – Odeon Theatre, Romania 
 Hamlet – Réplika Theatre, Spain
 Romeo and Juliet – Shakespeare's Globe Theatre, UK
 Measure for Measure – National Theatre, Craiova, Romania
 The Tempest – Nowy Theatre, Poznań
 Lumping in Fargo – Transversal Theater Company, Netherlands

See also
Gdańsk Shakespeare Theatre

References

External links
Gdańsk Shakespeare Festival
Gdańsk Shakespeare Theatre
Theatrum Gedanense Foundation 

Theatre festivals in Poland
Shakespeare festivals
Culture in Gdańsk
Summer events in Poland
Events in Gdańsk